The Ras Al Khaimah Golf Challenge was a golf tournament on the Challenge Tour, Europe's second tier men's professional golf tour, held in Ras Al Khaimah, United Arab Emirates. It was first played in 2016 as the penultimate event ahead of the season-ending NBO Golf Classic Grand Final in neighboring Oman. The tournament was last played in 2017. Beginning in 2018, the course will host the Ras Al Khaimah Challenge Tour Grand Final.

Winners

References

External links
Coverage on the Challenge Tour's official site

Former Challenge Tour events
Golf tournaments in the United Arab Emirates
Autumn events in the United Arab Emirates